Die Trying was a four-member rock band formed in 2001 and based in Sacramento, California.

After signing a contract with Island Records in 2002, they released their first single, "Oxygen's Gone", followed by their self-titled debut album on June 10, 2003.

Discography
 Sparrows (EP) (2002)
 Die Trying (2003)
 Die Young (Demo Tape) (2007)

Members
 Jassen Jensen – vocals
 Jack Sinamian – guitar
 Steve Avery – bass
 Matt Conley – drums

References

External links
 DieTryingMusic.com Web Archive
 Die Trying on MTV Artists
 "Oxygen's Gone" Music Video on YouTube

Musical groups established in 2001
Rock music groups from California
American post-grunge musical groups
Musical groups from Sacramento, California